Major Mukul Deva (Retd.) (born 29 January 1961) is an Indian polymath. Based in Singapore, he is a motivational keynote speaker, executive coach, business mentor and bestselling author. He writes spy-military thrillers on terrorism, action, crime as well as business and self-help books.

An alumnus of La Martiniere College, Lucknow, the National Defence Academy, Khadakvasla and the Indian Military Academy, Dehradoon, Mukul, an ex-Indian Army officer, is the founder-director of a professional security company, MSD Security Pvt Ltd, India, and a learning & organisational development company, Influence Solutions Pte Ltd, Singapore.

Bibliography 
His works include:
 "Time After Time", (Minerva Press, 2000),
 "S.T.R.I.P.T.E.A.S.E. - The Art of Corporate Warfare", (Penguin, 2002 & Marshall Cavendish, 2012) 
 "M.O.D.E.L. The Return of the Employee", (Sage, 2006 / Cerunnos 2019) 
"Women In Cinema", (HarperCollins, 2007) - co-authored with Wanti Singh
 "Laskhar", (HarperCollins 2008), 
 "Salim Must Die", (HarperCollins, 2009)
 "Blowback", (HarperCollins, 2010)
 "Tanzeem", (HarperCollins, 2011)  
 "The Dust Will Never Settle", (HarperCollins, 2012) 
 "R.I.P.", (Westland, 2012) 
 "Weapon of Vengeance" (TOR, USA, 2012)
 "F.C.U.K. Your Way to Success", (Marshall Cavendish & Westland, 2013)  
 "And Death Came Calling", (HarperCollins, 2014)
 "The Garud Strikes", (Westland, 2014)  
 "Assassins", (TOR, USA, 2015)
 "Pound of Flesh", (Westland, 2016) 
 "Make Success A Habit", (Armour, 2017)
"Rise Through The Ranks", (Influence Solutions, 2019) - co-authored with Karen Leong and Wendy McDonald.

See also
 List of Indian writers

References

External links 
 Mukul Deva's website
 The story behind Weapon of Vengeance - Essay by Mukul Deva at Upcoming4.me

Indian male novelists
Living people
1961 births